Euchrysops reducta, the Jackson's Cupid, is a butterfly in the family Lycaenidae. It is found in Senegal, Guinea, Burkina Faso, Ivory Coast, Ghana, northern Nigeria, northern Cameroon, the Central African Republic, the Democratic Republic of the Congo, Uganda and Ethiopia. The habitat consists of Guinea savanna and the southern edges of the Sudan savanna.

References

Butterflies described in 1924
Euchrysops